The Ventana Wilderness of Los Padres National Forest is a federally designated wilderness area located in the Santa Lucia Range along the Central Coast of California. This wilderness was established in 1969 when the Ventana Wilderness Act redesignated the 55,800-acre (22,600 ha) Ventana Primitive Area as the Ventana Wilderness and added land, totalling .

Etymology 

The Ventana Wilderness is named for the unique notch called "The Window" (ventana in Spanish) on a ridge near Ventana Double Cone. According to local legend, this notch was once a natural stone arch.

History

Native America use 

Three tribes of Native Americans — the Ohlone, Esselen, and Salinan — are believed to have been the first people to inhabit the area. The Ohlone, also known as the Costanoans, are believed to have lived in the region from San Francisco to Point Sur. The Esselen lived in the area between Point Sur south to Big Creek, and inland, including the upper tributaries of the Carmel River and Arroyo Seco watersheds. The Salinan lived from Big Creek south to San Carpóforo Creek. Archaeological evidence shows that the Esselen lived in Big Sur as early as 3500 BC, leading a nomadic, hunter-gatherer existence.

The indigenous people lived near the coast in winter, where they harvested rich stocks of mussels, abalone and other sea life. In the summer and fall they moved inland to harvest acorns gathered from the black oak, canyon live oak and tanbark oak, primarily on upper slopes in areas on the upper slopes of the steep canyons.

Pico Blanco, which splits the north and south forks of the Little Sur River, was sacred in the native traditions of the Rumsien and the Esselen, who revered the mountain as a sacred place from which all life originated. The Spanish mission system led to the virtual destruction of the Indian population. Estimates for the pre-contact populations of most native groups in California have varied substantially. Alfred L. Kroeber suggests a 1770 population for the Esselen of 500. Sherburne F. Cook raises this estimate to 750. A more recent calculation (based on baptism records and density) is that they numbered 1,185-1,285.

Founding and additions 

U.S. Forest Service Chief Forester R. Y. Stuart ordered the Monterey Ranger District to establish the Ventana Primitive Area. When the U.S. Congress passed the Wilderness Act of 1964, the Ventana Primitive Area was formally designated as wilderness by law, rather than by a Forest Service regulation, which made the area's status subject to change at will. The Ventana Wilderness Area was formally established on August 18, 1969. The Ventana initially included   acres of primarily extremely rugged terrain within the Santa Lucia Range of the Monterey Ranger District.

In 1998, the Ventana Wilderness Alliance was organized. At their founding, they conducted an inventory of public lands within the Los Padres National Forest Monterey Ranger District. Their goal was to assess the suitability of land in the region for inclusion in federal wilderness. Their findings persuaded US Congressman Sam Farr to sponsor the Big Sur Wilderness and Conservation Act. A very small part, on the eastern edge of the wilderness is managed by the Bureau of Land Management.

Topography 

The topography of the Ventana Wilderness is characterized by steep-sided, sharp-crested ridges separating V-shaped youthful valleys. Most streams fall rapidly through narrow, vertical-walled canyons over bedrock or a veneer of boulders. Waterfalls, deep pools and thermal springs are found along major streams.

Flora and fauna 

Marked vegetation changes occur within the Wilderness, attributable to dramatic climatic and topographic variations coupled with an extensive fire history. Much of the Ventana Wilderness is covered by dense communities of chaparral, a group of fire-prone plant species, consisting largely of chamise and various species of manzanita and ceanothus. Other plant communities found in area include oak woodland (coast live oak, valley oak, etc.) and pine woodlands (Coulter pine and Knobcone pine). Poison oak is found throughout the area. Deep narrow canyons cut by the fast moving Big Sur and Little Sur rivers support stands of coastal redwood (some old-growth forest), big leaf maple, and sycamore. Small scattered stands of the rare, endemic bristlecone fir may be found on rocky slopes and canyon bottoms. Mountain lion, bobcat, bear, deer, fox and coyotes range the wilderness, as does the California condor, reintroduced to the region by the Ventana Wildlife Society.

Access 

During the 1930s, the United States Civilian Conservation Corps constructed an extensive network of trails and trailheads that provided access to the Wilderness. A number of these are no longer in use. The Pine Ridge trailhead at Big Sur Station near Pfeiffer Big Sur State Park is by far the most popular starting point. Other trailheads include Bottchers Gap, Los Padres Dam, China Camp, and Arroyo Seco. Much of the area is very rugged and trails within the Wilderness are frequently overgrown and challenging to follow. Off-trail travel can be extremely difficult due to the steep, unstable terrain, and dense vegetation, like Pacific madrone, manzanita, and ceanothus. As is the case in most designated Wilderness areas, motorized equipment and mechanized transport are not allowed. Hunting of feral pigs (Sus scrofa) or European boar, which were introduced into the Carmel Valley area in 1927, is permitted by license.

References

Further reading 

 Hiking the Big Sur Country, Jeffrey P. Schaffer (1988) 
 Map of Ventana Wilderness, Los Padres National Forest, USDA Forest Service (1987)
 Trail Guide to Los Padres National Forest, Ventana Chapter, Sierra Club (2003)

External links 

 Ventana Wilderness Alliance
 Ventana Chapter, Sierra Club
 Wilderness Areas, Los Padres National Forest
 A Brief Land Status History of the Monterey Ranger District, David Rogers (2002)

Wilderness areas of California
Monterey Ranger District, Los Padres National Forest
Protected areas of Monterey County, California
Protected areas established in 1969
1969 establishments in California
Santa Lucia Range
Big Sur